Chen Qiaozhu is a Chinese professional association football player who plays for Meizhou Hakka in the Chinese Women's Super League.

References

Living people
1999 births
Chinese women's footballers
China women's international footballers
Footballers at the 2020 Summer Olympics
Olympic footballers of China
Women's association football defenders